Prothrinax is a genus of moths of the family Noctuidae. The genus was erected by George Hampson in 1908.

Species
Prothrinax luteomedia (Smith, 1907)
Prothrinax incana Köhler, 1979

References

Amphipyrinae